Corilla erronea is a species of air-breathing land snail, a terrestrial pulmonate gastropod mollusk in the family Corillidae.

Variety of this species include Corilla erronea var. eronella Gude, 1896.

Distribution
Distribution of Corilla erronea includes Sri Lanka.

References

External links

Corillidae
Gastropods described in 1853